Jeyrick Sigmaton (born February 15, 1994), better known as Carrot Man, is a Filipino actor and model. He went viral in 2016 and was discovered by guesting in Kapuso Mo, Jessica Soho.

Personal life and career 
Sigmaton is a native Igorot of Ekachakran tribe from Mountain Province and his only livelihood, before he was discovered and went  viral through guesting in Kapuso Mo, Jessica Soho, was lifting baskets of carrots to be delivered by trucks; thus he was called 'Carrot Man'. And when he was asked which celebrity he wanted to see, he answered the new host in GMA, Willie Revillame, then he guested on Revillame's show in GMA, Wowowin.

On 2021, Sigmaton won the Best Actor award for the Short Film category at the International Film Festival Manhattan (IFFM) Autumn 2021 in New York.

References

External links 
 

Living people
 1994 births
 Igorot people
Filipino male film actors
Filipino male models
People from Mountain Province
Filipino Internet celebrities